Esra is a common Turkish given name for females. It is also a common Arabic name. People named Esra include:

Given name 
 Esra Battaloğlu, Turkish geneticist
 Esra Bilgiç (born 1992), Turkish actress 
 Esra Dalfidan (born 1975), Turkish singer
 Esra Dermancıoğlu (born 1968), Turkish actress
 Esra Erol (born 1985), Turkish women's footballer
 Esra Güler (born 1994), Turkish women's footballer
 Esra Gümüş (born 1982), Turkish volleyball player
 Esra Gündar (born 1980), Turkish handball player
 Esra Kiraz (born 1992), Turkish armwrestler
Esra Mungan, Turkish academic
 Esra Özatay (born 1976), Turkish female military officer and military aerobatics aviator 
 Esra Özkan (born 1996), Turkish women's footballer
 Esra Sert (born 1976), Turkish journalist
 Esra Sibel Tezkan (born 1993), Turkish-German women's footballer
 Esra Şencebe (born 1991), Turkish basketball player
 Esra Solmaz (born 1995), Turkish women's footballer
 Esra Tromp (born 1990), Dutch female cyclist
 Esra Yıldız (born 1997), Turkish female boxer
 Princess Esra (born 1936), a princess of the Asaf Jah Dynasty of Hyderabad state

See also
ESRA (disambiguation)

Turkish feminine given names